Eric Abraham (born March 1954) is a South African-British producer and former journalist and activist. Born and raised in South Africa, he moved to England in 1977 where he lived in exile for 15 years for his reporting in opposition to the Apartheid government in the press. He has since worked in theatre and screen, co-founding the London-based Portobello Productions as well as Cape Town's Isango Portobello and Fugard Theatre.

Early life
Abraham was born in the Wynberg area of Cape Town and grew up in Rondebosch. His father was a naval commander who had arrived in South Africa from Hungary before World War II to escape antisemitism. Abraham attended South African College High School. He participated in school productions and ran a film society. He later received a Spectemur Agendo Award from the school in 2019 for his contributions to civil liberties and the performing arts.

Abraham studied Law at the University of Cape Town, but has said he was "hardly ever at lectures because there was something more important in those days" as a student union leader and activist. He began his career in journalism, setting up the South African News Agency (SANA) as a correspondent on human rights abuses and black politics in South Africa for foreign press outlets such as the BBC and The Guardian. He was placed under a five-year banning order and house arrest by the Apartheid government in 1976 for his reporting. After receiving death threats, Abraham fled to Botswana clandestinely with external help in January 1977. He could not return to his home country until Apartheid ended, and was granted political asylum in the UK. He found a job as a producer for BBC Panorama.

Filmography

Film
Bintley's Mozart (1987) – documentary
Life and Extraordinary Adventures of Private Ivan Chonkin (1994)
Kolya (1996)
Mojo (1997)
The War Zone (1999)
Dark Blue World (2001)
Birthday Girl (2001)
Empties (2007)
Quiet Chaos (2008)
Kooky (2010)
The Forgiveness of Blood (2011)
Ida (2013)
Three Brothers (2014)
Moffie (2019)

Television
BBC Panorama (1981–1983) – 7 episodes
Seal Morning (1986) – 6 episodes
ScreenPlay (1986) – 1 episode
Lost Belongings (1987) – Miniseries
Danny, the Champion of the World (1989) – television film
Othello (1989) – television film
The Maestro and the Diva (1990) – documentary
A Murder of Quality (1991) – television film
Still Life at the Penguin Cafe (1991) – television film
True Tilda (1997)
Dalziel and Pascoe (1997–1998) — 11 episodes
Falls the Shadow: The Life and Times of Athol Fugard (2012) – documentary

Notes

References

External links

Portobello Productions

Living people
1954 births
BBC television producers
British film production company founders
British theatre managers and producers
People from Cape Town
People from Rondebosch
South African expatriates in England
South African film producers
South African journalists
South African people of Hungarian-Jewish descent
South African refugees
South African television producers
South African theatre managers and producers
University of Cape Town alumni
White South African anti-apartheid activists